Mythimna borbonensis is a moth in the family Noctuidae. It is found in Réunion and Mauritius.

The length of its forewings is approx. 15–16 mm.

References

External links
 Picture of Mythimna borbonensis on Flickr
 Picture of Mythimna borbonensis - E.Vingerhoedt on drlegrain.be
 genitalia figures of this species were published in ESPERIANA, 1998, Buchreihe zur Entomologie Bd 6: 1-843   (under: Mythimna mauritiusi)

Moths described in 1996
Mythimna (moth)
Moths of Mauritius
Moths of Réunion